Matt Guillory (born January 16, 1974) is an American musician. He mainly plays keyboards and tends to write progressive metal. He has often been compared to the Swedish keyboard player Jens Johansson, famous for his work in the power metal band Stratovarius. Matt Guillory has worked for Mike Varney, appearing on several mid 1990s records as session player. Guillory also works with James LaBrie, best known as Dream Theater's vocalist, as a composer and keyboardist on the singer's first five solo releases. He was one of the founding members of the Bay Area based progressive metal band Dali's Dilemma. Guillory is a long time user of the Roland JD-800 synthesizer, which he plugs into a Line 6 Pod amp modelling/effects unit and a wah pedal to create a more guitar-like tone for his lead sound.

Discography 
 Dali's Dilemma – Manifesto for Futurism
Mogg/Way– Edge of the World – keyboards
 George Bellas – Turn of the Millennium – keyboard pads & keyboard solos
 George Bellas – Mind over Matter – keyboard solos
John West– Mind Journey – keyboards
James Murphy– Convergence – keyboards
 James Murphy – Feeding the Machine – keyboards
 Various Artists – Encores, Legends & Paradox: A tribute to the music of ELP – keyboards
 Explorers Club – Age of Impact – keyboards
 James LaBrie's MullMuzzler – Keep It to Yourself – keyboards, piano
 James LaBrie's MullMuzzler – MullMuzzler 2 – keyboards, piano, sampling
 James LaBrie – Elements of Persuasion – keyboards, additional guitar
 James LaBrie – Static Impulse – keyboards, backing vocals (Guillory also sang the lead vocals on the demo recordings for this album)
 James LaBrie – Impermanent Resonance – keyboards, background vocals
 Zero Hour – Zero Hour – keyboards
 Marco Sfogli – There's Hope

References 

21st-century American keyboardists
1974 births
Living people
American heavy metal keyboardists
Explorers Club (band) members
20th-century American keyboardists